The Georgia Southern Eagles football program represents Georgia Southern University in football as part of the Sun Belt Conference. The current head coach is Clay Helton. The Eagles have won six FCS (I-AA) national championships and have produced two Walter Payton Award winners. Georgia Southern first continuously fielded a football team in 1924, but play was suspended for World War II and did not return until 1981. The Eagles competed as an FCS independent from 1984 to1992 and as a member of the Southern Conference from 1993 to 2013, winning 10 SoCon championships. In 2014, Georgia Southern moved to the FBS level and joined the Sun Belt Conference, winning the conference championship outright in its first year. Georgia Southern's main Sun Belt rivals are Appalachian State and Georgia State.

History

Early history
As First District A&M, the school began organizing football teams as early as 1909.
However, the college first continuously fielded a team in 1924. In 1929, B.L. "Crook" Smith, a sports standout from Mercer University, was hired as football coach and athletics director and would lead the football team for 13 seasons. Football was suspended in 1941 at the outset of World War II and would not return for 41 years.

Erk Russell (1981–1989)
In 1978, President Dale Lick decided that football should be revived at Georgia Southern College. Despite a faculty senate vote against renewing the sport, Lick worked to generate support for the endeavor. In 1982, the school hired Erk Russell, the popular and charismatic defensive coordinator at Georgia, to coach the new football team. On the hire, humorist Lewis Grizzard said, "When they landed Erk Russell, they got themselves a franchise."  The Eagles fielded a club team in 1982 and 1983 and began official NCAA Division I-AA play in 1984. The next year, the Eagles would win their first Division I-AA national championship in Tacoma, Washington, defeating Furman, in only the team's fourth year in existence, second as a varsity team. The Eagles would return to Tacoma the next year and win the championship vs. Arkansas State. In 1989, the Eagles became the first college team to go 15–0 in the 20th century, winning the national championship on their home field vs. Stephen F. Austin. Soon after the game, Russell retired.

Tim Stowers (1990–1995)
Tim Stowers was hired to succeed Russell after Georgia Southern's 1989 (15–0) national title. Stowers was the 1989 offensive coordinator, one of only two coordinators since 1900 to direct an offense of a team with a 15–0 record. Stowers led the Eagles to their fourth I-AA championship against Nevada in his first season. He also won Georgia Southern's first Southern Conference Title in 1993, the Eagles' first year in the league, and was named 1993 Southern Conference Coach of the Year. However, despite these accomplishments, Stowers was never able to live up to the expectations set by Russell and was fired in 1995 after a 9–4 record by then-new athletics director Sam Baker, who never saw Stowers coach a game.

Frank Ellwood (1996)
Stowers was succeeded by interim coach Frank Ellwood for one year. The 1996 season was the first losing season in the modern era as the Eagles fell to 4–7.

Paul Johnson (1997–2001)
The next coach for the Eagles was Paul Johnson, a former offensive coordinator for Erk Russell's 1985 and 1986 championship teams. Johnson found instant success, taking the Eagles to the playoffs in his first season. He, along with Eagle legend Adrian N. Peterson, reached the 1998 national championship; however, the Eagles lost the game to UMass in Chattanooga, Tennessee. The Eagles rebounded under Johnson and won back-to-back national championships in 1999 (vs. Youngstown State) and 2000 (vs. Montana). Both championships were won in Chattanooga. After the 2001 season, Johnson resigned to become the head coach of Navy.

Mike Sewak (2002–2005)
Johnson was succeeded by Mike Sewak. Despite winning the Southern Conference championship twice in his tenure (outright title in 2002 and shared title in 2004), his lack of postseason success as well as a falling out with former head coach Erk Russell led to his firing after the 2005 season.

Brian VanGorder (2006)
Brian VanGorder, a former defensive coordinator at Georgia, was hired to succeed Sewak. In the first of many controversial moves, VanGorder scrapped Georgia Southern's famed triple-option offense and did away with certain traditions, such as the team's arrival at home games on yellow school buses. Erk Russell had also died unexpectedly of a stroke on the eve the first game of the 2006 season after addressing the team on the night before. VanGorder led the team to a 3–8 record, the worst record during Georgia Southern's FCS tenure. After his one year as coach, VanGorder resigned to take an assistant coach position at the University of South Carolina, but accepted a job with the Atlanta Falcons five weeks later.

Chris Hatcher (2007–2009)
Chris Hatcher, formerly the head coach at Valdosta State, which he led to the 2004 NCAA Division II Football Championship, was named the new head coach on January 19, 2007. Hatcher led the Eagles back to a winning record with a 7–4 finish, barely missing the FCS playoffs. However, Hatcher could not replicate the success of his first season, going 11–11 in the following two seasons, and he was fired after the conclusion of the 2009 season, the team's third modern era season with a losing record at 5–6, and the second within four years.

Jeff Monken (2010–2013)
On November 29, 2009, school officials announced that Jeff Monken, a longtime assistant coach under Paul Johnson, would become the next head coach of the Eagles. Monken's hiring signaled the return of the triple-option offense which brought success to the program in years past. In Monken's first year, the Eagles finished the regular season with a 7–4 record and made their first playoff appearance since 2005, advancing to the semifinals, where the Eagles fell to the Delaware Blue Hens.

During the 2011 season, Georgia Southern was ranked No. 1 in the FCS for the first time since the 2001 season. Additionally, Georgia Southern clinched the Southern Conference Football Championship for the first time since 2004 and first time outright since 2002. The Eagles finished the 2011 regular season with a 9–2 record; however, they were ousted in the semifinals for a second straight year by the eventual FCS champion North Dakota State Bison. In the 2012 season, the Eagles finished the regular season with an 8–3 record with a share of the Southern Conference Championship; however, the Eagles fell for a third straight time in what was ultimately the team's final FCS playoff game in the FCS semifinals, losing a rematch of the previous year's semifinal game against North Dakota State. In the team's final FCS season, the Eagles compiled a 7–4 record. In the final game of that season, the Eagles earned an upset win over Florida 26–20, the Eagles' first win over a Power Five FBS team, and the Gators' first loss to an FCS program. On December 24, 2013, Monken resigned to become the next head coach of Army.

After years of rumors and fan speculation, Georgia Southern announced its intentions to move to the Football Bowl Subdivision level in April 2012. The university plans to raise $36.6 million over eight years to accommodate the move. Paulson Stadium would be expanded to FBS-standards by constructing a  football operations center in the eastern end of the stadium and adding 6,300 seats on the north stands. Additionally, students voted in favor of raising student athletic fees by $100 to accommodate the move. $25 of the fee increase would be used for the stadium expansion project while the remaining $75 is implemented as the "FBS Fee".

On July 27, 2012, then-Athletics Director Sam Baker resigned. Baker was an ardent supporter of remaining in the FCS despite then-university president Brooks Keel's proclamation, mainly due to the financial ramifications of moving to a higher level. On November 12, 2012, President Keel named Tom Kleinlein as athletics director. On March 27, 2013, Georgia Southern announced its move to the Sun Belt Conference on July 1, 2014, becoming bowl-eligible in 2015. In the 2013 season, Georgia Southern's football schedule remained the same, but the team was ineligible for the Southern Conference title as well as postseason play. The university paid the Southern Conference $600,000 in exit fees.

Willie Fritz (2014–2015)
On January 10, 2014, Willie Fritz, formerly the head coach of Sam Houston State, was named as the Eagles' ninth modern era head coach and first of the FBS era. In the Eagles' first FBS season, the team finished the season 9–3 overall and was undefeated in Sun Belt Conference play at 8–0, winning the outright conference championship. The Eagles became only the third team ever to win a conference title in its first FBS season, after Nevada in 1992 (Big West Conference) and Marshall in 1997 (Mid-American Conference). They were also the first team ever to go unbeaten in conference play in their first FBS season. Since the Eagles were under transitional status, the university filed for a postseason waiver to allow the Eagles to play in a bowl game; however, the NCAA denied Georgia Southern's waiver request and a subsequent appeal since enough full member FBS teams became bowl-eligible during the season. In the 2015 season, Fritz led the Eagles to an 8-4 record, receiving their first bowl bid to the GoDaddy Bowl on December 23, 2015 against Bowling Green.

On December 11, 2015, Fritz resigned as the Eagles head coach to accept the head coaching position at Tulane. Assistant head coach and running backs coach Dell McGee was appointed as interim head coach for the GoDaddy Bowl game, where Georgia Southern defeated Bowling Green 58–27.

Tyson Summers (2016–2017)
Tyson Summers was hired on December 21, 2015 to succeed Fritz. Summers had served as safeties coach for Georgia Southern during the 2006 season under Brian VanGorder, and held the defensive coordinator and safeties coach roles at Colorado State in 2015. During Summers' first season in 2016, Georgia Southern suffered its first losing season in the FBS era, and fourth overall in the modern era. Summers was fired on October 22, 2017 after starting the 2017 season with a six-game losing streak.

Chad Lunsford (2017–2021)
After Summers was fired, assistant head coach Chad Lunsford was appointed as interim head coach for the rest of the 2017 season. Lunsford was officially named head coach on November 27, 2017. He finished out the 2017 season at 2-4. The overall record of 2-10 was the worst record in the program's overall history and marked the first time in the modern era that the Eagles posted back-to-back losing seasons.

In Lunsford's first official season as head coach, he led the Eagles back to a winning record and bowl eligibility, finishing the regular season 9-3 and 6-2 in conference play. Georgia Southern defeated Eastern Michigan 23–21 in the Camellia Bowl, giving the Eagles their first 10-win season since the FCS-to-FBS transition. In the 2019 season, the Eagles posted a 7-5 record, with a 5-3 record in conference play. The Eagles earned an invitation to the Cure Bowl, suffering their first loss in a bowl game loss at the hands of Liberty. In the 2020 season, the Eagles posted an identical 7-5 record, dropping to 4-4 conference play. Lunsford's team capped the season with an impressive 38-3 victory over the Louisiana Tech Bulldogs in the New Orleans Bowl.

The team's fortunes changed in 2021, when a 1-3 start to the season led to Lunsford's firing. Cornerbacks coach Kevin Whitley took over as interim head coach. The Eagles ultimately posted a 3-9 record, the team's third losing season since transitioning to the FBS, and the second-worst season in the modern era.

Clay Helton (2022–present) 
On November 2, 2021, Georgia Southern hired Clay Helton, former head coach of the USC Trojans, as the new head coach. On September 10, 2022, Clay Helton led Georgia Southern to a 45-42 upset victory over Nebraska, earning national attention. The victory marked the second time that Georgia Southern has beaten a Power 5 school since defeating Florida in 2013.

Conference affiliations
 Independent (1924–1941, 1982–1991)
 Southern Conference (1992–2013)
 Sun Belt Conference (2014–present)

Championships

National championships

 1985 – Coach Erk Russell and the Eagles won their first national championship vs. Furman University in the Tacoma Dome in Tacoma, Washington. Quarterback Tracy Ham threw for 419 yards and rushed for another 90 to overcome a 28–6 deficit.
 1986 – The Eagles returned to Tacoma to defeat the Arkansas State Indians. Tracy Ham earned 486 rushing and passing yards and three touchdowns.
 1989 – In Erk Russell's final game, the Eagles defeated Stephen F. Austin in Statesboro, Georgia, in front of 25,725 fans to complete a perfect 15–0 season. Quarterback Raymond Gross engineered 17 fourth-quarter points, including a game-winning field goal with 1:41 remaining in the game.
 1990 – Tim Stowers' Eagles win their fourth national championship vs. Nevada
 1999 – Paul Johnson won his first national championship in Chattanooga, Tennessee, vs. Youngstown State in Jim Tressel's last national championship game as a Penguin (Jim Tressel's last game as a Penguin was against the Richmond Spiders in the playoffs in 2000). Adrian Peterson ran for a championship game record 247 yards on 25 carries and scored three touchdowns.
 2000 – The Eagles defeated the Montana Grizzlies to win their sixth and final FCS championship.

National runners-up
 1988 – The Eagles lost to Furman University in Pocatello, Idaho.
 1998 – In Paul Johnson's first national championship game, the Eagles lost to UMass.

Conference championships

† Co-championship

Postseason

Bowl games
The Eagles have participated in five bowl games with a record of 3–2.

Division I-AA/FCS Playoffs results
The Eagles have appeared in the I-AA/FCS playoffs 19 times with an overall record of 45–13. They are six time National Champions (1985, 1986, 1989, 1990, 1999, 2000) and two time National runner-up (1988, 1998).

Head coaches

† Interim head coach

Rivalries

Appalachian State

The makings of the rivalry truly began when the Mountaineers beat the Eagles in the quarterfinals of the 1987 I-AA Playoffs. Since Georgia Southern joined Appalachian State in the Southern Conference in 1993, the schools have played each other annually in football. Both teams are now members of the Sun Belt Conference. Appalachian State leads the series 20–16–1 through the 2022 season. It is considered by many to be the most passionate and competitive rivalry in the Sun Belt Conference, and one of the most underrated rivalries in all of college football.

Georgia State

Georgia Southern and Georgia State have only competed against each other in football since 2014. The series with Georgia State is 3–6 through the 2022 season.

Traditions

Nickname
The athletics teams of Georgia Southern University are referred to as the Eagles. However, the school has gone by a number of different nicknames. From as early as 1907 the teams of the then First District A&M school were referred to as the Culture to reflect the agricultural background of the school. From 1924 to 1941, the nickname was the Blue Tide. After World War II, athletic teams were referred to as the Professors reflecting the school's status as a teacher-training college. However, in 1959 when the school was renamed Georgia Southern College, a student vote was held to determine the new mascot; among the 104 entries, voters chose Eagles over Colonels by a narrow margin. In 1997, a contest was held to select the official name of the mascot, incoming freshman Imen Edmond and Heidi Barber won with the name GUS.

Beautiful Eagle Creek

When Georgia Southern resurrected football in 1981, it lacked tradition. A drainage ditch that the team had to cross several times a day during football practice came to be called Beautiful Eagle Creek by Coach Erk Russell. When the Eagles traveled to Northern Iowa during the 1985 playoffs, Russell took along a jug of this Eagle Creek water to sprinkle on the field.

The Hugo Bowl
In 1989, ESPN was to broadcast a Thursday Night Football game between Georgia Southern and the Middle Tennessee State Blue Raiders. However, Hurricane Hugo, a Category 4 storm, was headed straight toward the coast of Georgia. Hugo ranked as the 11th most intense hurricane at time of landfall to strike the United States in the 20th century, with the highest ever recorded storm surge on the East Coast. Nevertheless, the decision was made to continue with the game. For safety purposes, an open line was kept between the press box at Paulson Stadium and the National Hurricane Center in Florida. The Eagles went on to defeat MTSU by a score of 26–0 in a classic that will forever be known in Eagle history as the Hugo Bowl.

This was the first night game played at Paulson Stadium. Temporary lighting was used for the game because the stadium was not outfitted with permanent lighting until the 1994 season. Many feared that the booms used to hoist the stadium lights would tip over due to the heavy wind.  While it was initially expected to be a sellout crowd, and the official attendance was listed as 16,449, the actual attendance was in the neighborhood of only 3,000 due to the approaching storm.

Plain uniforms
The uniforms consist of plain white pants, blue helmets with a white stripe down the middle and the player's number on the sides, and blue jerseys. This minimalist look was adopted more or less out of necessity. When the program was revived in 1982, the school did not have a large budget.  Indeed, the equipment budget was so limited that only plain white practice pants could be purchased. Hence, the practice pants doubled as game pants. Russell bought solid blue helmets and had the players put a piece of tape down the middle. With the subsequent success of the Eagles, the basic design has remained the same, with the only real changes in recent years being a white stripe down the middle of the helmets and the addition of names to the backs of the jerseys. Sports Illustrated has ranked the uniforms as being the third best in college football.

Yellow school buses
When the football program was restarted in 1981, money was tight. In fact, there was not enough money to furnish transportation to home games. The Bulloch County school system sold two buses for a dollar each to the team. The buses have been used by the team ever since as transportation to Allen E. Paulson Stadium. This tradition continued even when the Eagles rose to powerhouse status.  This briefly ended with the arrival of Brian VanGorder, following his scrapping of the Eagles' triple-option rushing attack. The tradition was revived after VanGorder's departure.

Black flag
In 2011, the team took the field leading with a solid black flag. The flag symbolized their motto "No quarter given, no quarter taken."  During the game it was placed behind the bench.  The flag was carried by safety Derek Heyden, who suffered a career ending neck injury early in the season.

The Eagle's Elbow
During Chad Lunsford's tenure, the coach celebrated important victories by brandishing a steel chair adorned with the fallen opponent's logo, slamming the chair on the locker room floor, and performing an elbow drop on the chair. The tradition was started following Lunsford's first win, a 52-point shutout of South Alabama, after the team had gone winless in the first 9 games of the 2017 season.

Wins over Ranked Opponents

Stadium
Georgia Southern's home football games are played at Allen E. Paulson Stadium. The stadium was dedicated on September 29, 1984, and has an official seating capacity of 25,000. Prior to the Eagles' first FBS season, Paulson Stadium underwent a major expansion project that included the addition of a new football operations center and more than 6,000 new seats. The stadium's attendance record of 25,735 was set on September 17, 2016, when the Eagles beat Louisiana-Monroe 23-21. Prior to the opening of Paulson Stadium and becoming a full FCS member in 1984, the Eagles played their first two modern era seasons at Womack Stadium on the campus of Statesboro High School.

Awards
The Eagles have won six NCAA FCS national championships, a mark surpassed only by the North Dakota State Bison.

Walter Payton Award
Georgia Southern is one of five schools to have multiple Walter Payton Award winners. The award, which honors the top offensive player in the FCS, was won by running back Adrian Peterson in 1999 and quarterback Jayson Foster in 2007.

Eddie Robinson Award
Three Georgia Southern coaches have won the AFCA Coach of the Year Award, given to the top coach in FCS. Erk Russell won it in 1989, Tim Stowers in 1990, and Paul Johnson in 1998.

Players

Retired numbers

Notable alumni

Future non-conference opponents 
Announced schedules as of August 10, 2022.

References

External links

 
 GATAdb box scores, 1982–present

 
American football teams established in 1924
1924 establishments in Georgia (U.S. state)